Sterling is a British brand of cigarettes, currently owned and manufactured by Gallaher Group, a subsidiary of Japan Tobacco in 2007.

History
Sterling had been a fairly popular mid-range brand up to the 1970s but sales dwindled and the brand was eventually discontinued.  The brand was officially re-launched in the United Kingdom in 2006. Sterling is the largest selling cheap brand in the UK and is the 8th biggest selling brand of cigarettes in the UK. According to data from AC Nielsen, Sterling has a 44% share in the cheap brand tobacco sector and has retail sales of an excess of £261million. They are available in four different colours, red, blue (smooth), green (menthol) and a blue-green gradient (click-on menthol "Fresh Taste"). Sterling Dual cigarettes are also available in Superking size.  In 2018, a double capsule cigarette was introduced as Sterling Double Capsule, available in king size.

Some advertising posters were made for Sterling cigarettes.

In 2020, Sterling Dual New launched without the capsule, due to the ban on menthol cigarettes in the UK.

Markets
Sterling is mainly sold in the United Kingdom, but also was or still is sold in The Netherlands, Cyprus, Spain, Australia, New Zealand, Papua New Guinea and the United States.

See also

 Tobacco smoking

References

Gallaher Group brands
Japan Tobacco brands
British brands